The 156th Indiana Infantry Battalion was an infantry battalion from Indiana that served in the Union Army between April 12 and August 4, 1865, during the American Civil War.

Service 
The battalion was organized at Indianapolis, Indiana, with a strength of 531 men and mustered in on April 12, 1865. The battalion consisted of five companies, two companies from the 4th and 5th district and another three from the 6th district. It left Indiana for Harper's Ferry, West Virginia on April 27. It was then placed on guard duty at various points in the Shenandoah Valley until early August, and was mustered out on August 4, 1865. During its service the battalion incurred seventeen fatalities and another fifty-four men deserted.

See also
 List of Indiana Civil War regiments

Notes

References

Bibliography 
 Dyer, Frederick H. (1959). A Compendium of the War of the Rebellion. New York and London. Thomas Yoseloff, Publisher. .
 Holloway, William R. (2004). Civil War Regiments From Indiana. eBookOnDisk.com Pensacola, Florida. .
 Terrell, W.H.H. (1866). The Report of the Adjutant General  of the State of Indiana. Containing Rosters for the Years 1861–1865, Volume 3. Indianapolis, Indiana. Samuel M. Douglass, State Printer.

Units and formations of the Union Army from Indiana
Military units and formations established in 1865
Military units and formations disestablished in 1865
1865 establishments in Indiana